Umyot is an urban locality (a work settlement) in Zubovo-Polyansky District of the Republic of Mordovia, Russia. As of the 2010 Census, its population was 2,822.

Administrative and municipal status
Within the framework of administrative divisions, the work settlement of Umyot, together with two rural localities, is incorporated within Zubovo-Polyansky District as Umyot Work Settlement (an administrative division of the district). As a municipal division, Umyot Work Settlement is incorporated within Zubovo-Polyansky Municipal District as Umyotskoye Urban Settlement.

References

Notes

Sources

Urban-type settlements in Mordovia
Zubovo-Polyansky District
